Jose Toves "Pedo" Terlaje (September 23, 1946 – January 30, 2023) was a Guamanian politician. Terlaje served as a senator in the Guam Legislature and Chairperson of the Committee on Public Safety, Border Safety, Military and Veteran Affairs, Mayors Council, Infrastructure and Public Transit.

Early life and education
Jose Toves "Pedo" Terlaje was born in Yona, Guam, on September 23, 1946.

Terlaje graduated from George Washington Senior High School in 1967. He earned an Associate of Arts in Political Science and subsequently a Bachelor of Arts in Business and Public Administration from the University of Guam in 1979.

Political career

Santos-Terlaje's HITA Campaign
In 1998, incumbent Governor Carl T.C. Gutierrez and Lieutenant Governor Madeleine Z. Bordallo had two Democratic primary election challenges for Governor and Lieutenant Governor of Guam. Pedo Terlaje was chosen as the running mate of Senator Angel L.G. Santos under the slogan Honesty, Integrity, Trust and Accountability (HITA), and Senator Thomas C. Ada ran with Senator Lourdes A. Leon Guerrero. The "HITA" ticket placed 3rd in the Democratic gubernatorial primary on September 5, 1998 with 19% of the Democratic primary votes.

Mayor of Yona 
Terlaje was first elected to serve as Mayor of Yona, Guam, in the 2000 general election. He was reelected to two more terms in 2004 and 2008, respectively. His tenure as Mayor was from 2001 to 2013.

Guam Legislature

Elections 
Terlaje ran for the 29th Guam Legislature in 2006. He placed 7th in the Democratic primary election in August, advancing to the general election. He placed 23rd in the general election in November and did not earn a seat in the legislature.

Terlaje ran for the 35th Guam Legislature in 2018. He placed 11th in the Democratic primary election in August, advancing to the general election. He placed 15th in the general election in November, earning a seat in the legislature.

Leadership roles 
35th Guam Legislature - Committee on Public Safety, Border Safety, Military and Veteran Affairs, Mayors Council, Infrastructure and Public Transit

Personal life and death 
Terlaje died in January 2023, at the age of 76.

References 

1946 births
2023 deaths
20th-century American politicians
21st-century American politicians
Guamanian Democrats
Members of the Legislature of Guam
University of Guam alumni
Mayors of Yona, Guam